The queen bee acid (10-hydroxy-2-decenoic acid) or 10-HDA is a bio-active compound found in royal jelly.

Royal jelly acid is being investigated for its pharmacological activities. Reports indicate that it promotes neurogenesis of neural stem/progenitor cells (cells capable of differentiating into neurons, astrocytes, or oligodendrocytes) in vitro and could provide an effective method to treat and prevent neurological disorders.

In addition, royal jelly acid has been reported to have anti-tumor, anti-biotic, immunomodulatory, estrogenic, neurogenic, and innate immune response modulating activities.

In the United States, the Food and Drug Administration has taken legal action against companies that have used unfounded claims of health benefits to market royal jelly products.

See also
 10-Hydroxydecanoic acid
 2-Decenedioic acid

Notes
10-Hydroxy-2-decenoic Acid, a Major Fatty Acid from Royal Jelly, Inhibits VEGF-induced Angiogenesis in Human Umbilical Vein Endothelial Cells

References 

9. Royal Jelly Uses, Side Effects & Warnings 
https://www.drugs.com/mtm/royal-jelly.html
Medically reviewed by Drugs.com on Sep 29, 2020. Written by Cerner Multum.

Bee products
Fatty acids
Hydroxy acids